Pradeep Sri Jayaprakashdaran (born 13 January 1984) is a former Sri Lankan cricketer from the city of Colombo.

School times
Educated at the Royal College, Colombohe played in the Royal–Thomian and went on to play club level for the Tamil Union Cricket and Athletic Club.

International career
He has played one One Day International, against India in the group stage of the 2005 Indian Oil Cup.

External links

External links
 

Sri Lanka One Day International cricketers
Sri Lankan Tamil sportspeople
Alumni of Royal College, Colombo
Tamil Union Cricket and Athletic Club cricketers
Living people
1984 births